James Davis  "Blackie" Kincaid (August 11, 1930 – September 25, 2014) was an American football defensive back for the Washington Redskins National Football League. He played college football at the University of South Carolina and was drafted in the third round of the 1954 NFL Draft by the Los Angeles Rams. He also played for the Hamilton Tiger-Cats and Montreal Alouettes of the Canadian Football League. Kincaid died on September 25, 2014, in Goldsboro, North Carolina.

References

External links
Just Sports Stats

1930 births
2014 deaths
People from Ansted, West Virginia
American football defensive backs
Canadian football defensive backs
American players of Canadian football
South Carolina Gamecocks football players
Washington Redskins players
Hamilton Tiger-Cats players
Montreal Alouettes players
Players of American football from West Virginia